Vince or Vincent Clark (or Clarke) may refer to:

Vince Clarke (born 1960), English musician
Vince Clarke (cricketer) (born 1971), English cricketer 
Vin¢ Clarke (1922–1998), British science fiction fanwriter and editor
Vinnie Clark (born 1969), American football cornerback
Vince Clark, the main character in the British sitcom 15 Storeys High

See also
Vincent